Burundi competed at the 2017 World Championships in Athletics in London, United Kingdom, 4–13 August 2017.

Medalists 
The following competitors from Burundi won medals at the Championships:

Results
(q – qualified, NM – no mark, SB – season best)

Men 
Track and road events

Women 

Track and road events

References

Nations at the 2017 World Championships in Athletics
World Championships in Athletics
2017